Pazuzu was king of the demons of the wind in ancient Mesopotamian religion.

Pazuzu may also refer to:

Fictional characters
 Pazuzu (The Exorcist), in The Exorcist horror novels and film series
 Pazuzu (Dungeons & Dragons), in the Dungeons & Dragons role-playing game
 Pazuzu (Futurama), a recurring Futurama character
 Pazuzu, in the 2015 movie Sisters
 Pazuzu, in the video game Final Fantasy Mystic Quest
 Pazuzu, in the video game Hell: A Cyberpunk Thriller
 Pazuzu, in the video game Digital Devil Story: Megami Tensei II
 Pazuzu, in Rage of Bahamut (anime)
 Pazuzu, a character in the Tower of Druaga franchise
 Pazuzu, in the 2010 TV sitcom Neighbors from Hell
 Pazuzu, several Ultraman Gaia characters
 Pazuzu, a lieutenant of Lucifer (Prince of Darkness) in the Marvel universe
 Pazuzu, in the Cyborg 009 VS Devilman anime
 Suzy Pazuzu, in Howard the Duck comic stories

Music
 Pazuzu (band), an Austrian band, predecessor of Summoning (band)
 "Pazuzu (Black Rain)", a song by The Nefilim from the 1996 album Zoon
 "Pazuzu", a song by Behemoth from the 2007 album The Apostasy
 "Pazuzu For The Win", a song by Iwrestledabearonce from the 2009 album It's All Happening

See also
 Pazuza, nickname of Stafford Simon (1908–1960), an American jazz saxophonist
Pazuzu Algarad (1978–2015), American murderer 
 Oranssi Pazuzu, a Finnish band